Rudolph Goclenius the Younger (born Rudolph Göckel; 22 August 1572 – 3 March 1621) was a German physician and professor at Philipps University of Marburg.

Goclenius was born in Wittenberg, the oldest son of Rudolph Goclenius, who was also professor of physics, logic, mathematics and ethics at Marburg. He enrolled at the University of Marburg at the age of 15. As a student, Goclenius was a respondent to his father in a physical disputation and received his master's degree in 1591. After obtaining his medical degree in 1601, Goclenius became the first rector of the newly founded gymnasium in Büdingen and a personal physician (archiatrus) to Wolfgang Ernst I, Count of Isenburg-Büdingen. In 1608, he was appointed to the professorship of physics, astronomy and arithmetic at Marburg University. Afterwards, he took over the chairs of medicine (1611) and mathematics (1612) at the same place.

The younger Goclenius died in Marburg. His father wrote a poem for his funeral on 4 March 1621

As a physician he worked on cures against the plague. He became famous for his miraculous cure with the "weapon salve" or Powder of Sympathy. Based on the hermetic concepts of Paracelsus he published 1608 the proposition of a "magnetic" cure to heal wounds: the application of the salve on the weapon should heal the wounds afflicted by the weapon. This concept was brought to England by the alchemist Robert Fludd. A famous proponent was Sir Kenelm Digby. Synchronising the effects of the powder (which apparently caused a noticeable effect on the patient when applied) was actually suggested in the leaflet Curious Enquiries in 1687 as a means of solving the longitude problem.

He is the eponym of the lunar crater Goclenius. Already in 1651, the Jesuits Riccioli/Grimaldi honored him on behalf of his book Urania (1615) on astrology and astronomy.

Publications 
As a medical student:

 In Obitum Illustriss. Principis, &c., in: Kirchner, H. Parentatio, Perpetuae recordationis ergo habita, ... Domino Georgio, Landgravio Hassiae, Marburg 1596, p. 37 [a poem written on the occasion of the death of George I, Landgrave of Hesse-Darmstadt]
 Aphorismorum Chiromanticorum Tractatus Compendiosus, Lich 1597
 De Luctu Minuendo Ex currentis seculi perversitate: Oratio Brevis, Kopenhagen 1598
 Quaestiones Mixtas In Utramque Partem Controversas, cum adjuncta disputatione de Principiis Medicinae Paracelsicae, quod in arte medendi non habeant fundamentum, Marburg 1600 [his doctoral thesis]

Büdingen years (1601-1608):

 Oratio de scholarum necessitate et doctrina, pro apertura & fundatione Scholae Budingensis, Hanau 1601
 Uranoscopia, Chiroscopia & Metaposcopia, Lich 1603
 Epistola Dedicatoria [Dedicatory letter to Landgrave Moritz], in: Goclenius, R. [Sr.], Physicae Completae Speculum, Frankfurt 1604
 De Luxu Convivali Nostri Seculi, ..., Oratio, Lich 1604, Marburg 1607 (rev. ed.)
 De Pestis, Febrisque Pestilentis Causis, Marburg 1607
 Weiß und Weg / Sich for [sic] der schweren Seuche der Pestilenz / ... / zubewahren, Marburg 1607
 Uranoscopiae, Chiroscopiae, Metoposcopiae, Et Ophtalmoscopiae, Contemplatio, Frankfurt 1608 [new edition; dedicatory letter signed: Büdingen, July 29, 1607]
 De Vita Proroganda, Mainz 1608 [dedicatory letter signed: Büdingen, January 7, 1608]

Marburg years (1608-1621):

 Oratio Qua defenditur Vulnus Non Applicato Etiam Remedio, Marburg 1608 [inauguration as physics professor at Marburg University on April 24, 1608]
 Tractatus De Magnetica Curatione Vulneris, Marburg 1609 [rev. ed. of Oratio Qua defenditur Vulnus Non Applicato Etiam Remedio, Marburg 1608]
 Tractatus De Portentosis Luxuriosis ac Monstrosis nostri seculi convivijs, Marburg 1609 [rev. ed. of De Luxu Convivali Nostri Seculi, ..., Oratio, Marburg 1607]
 Tractatus De Magnetica Curatione Vulneris, Marburg 1610 [the latter two treatises in one book]. Further editions as:
 Tractatus Novus De Magnetica Vulnerum Curatione, Frankfurt 1613 [dedicatory letter signed: October 15, 1612]
 De Magnetica Vulnerum Curatione, ...,  Tractatus, s.l. 1613 [preface signed: October 28, 1612. The first part of this edition, without the Tractatus Alter, was reprinted as Tractatus De Manetica [sic] Vulnerum Curatione in Sylvester Rattray's Theatrum Sympatheticum Auctum (Nürnberg 1662, pp. 177–225). It was translated into German by F. J. Schmidt (Hamm 1978, pp. 5–63).]
 Apologeticus Pro Astromantia Discursus, Marburg 1611
 , Marburg 1612
 Loimographia, Frankfurt 1613
 Physicae Generalis Libri II, Frankfurt 1613
 Responsio ad quaestionem propositam, in: Promotio Solennis XX. Magistrorum (July 14, 1614), Marburg 1614, pp. 34–43
 Uraniae Divinatricis, Quoad Astrologiae generalia, Libri II (added to Augustini Niphi, De Auguriis, Libri II, Marburg 1614)
 Pro Artium Mathematicarum Laude, dignitate & praestantia, Oratio (1613), Marburg 1615
 Urania Cum Geminis Filiabus, Frankfurt 1615
 Synarthrosis Magnetica, Opposita Infaustae Anatomiae Joh. Roberti D. Theologi, Et Jesuitae, Pro Defensione Tractactus, de Magnetica vulnerum curatione, Marburg 1617 [translated into German by F. J. Schmidt: Wiederaufbau zur Verteidigung des Traktats über magnetische Wundheilung: gegen die glücklose Anatomie des Johannes Roberti SJ, Hamm 1979.] Against Jean Roberti.
 Tractatus De Portentosis Ac Luxuriosis Nostri Seculi Conviviis et Commessationibus, Marburg 1617
 Acroteleution Astrologicum, Marburg 1618
 Morosophia Ioannis Roberti D. Iesuitae, In Refutatione Synarthroseos Goclenianae, Anno 1618, Frankfurt 1619 [against Roberti]
 Assertio Medicinae Universalis Adversus Universalem Vulgo jactatam, Marburg 1620
 Synopsis Methodica Geometriae, Astronomiae, Astrologiae, Opticae & Geographiae, Frankfurt 1620
 Physiognomica & Chiromantica Specialia, Marburg 1621

Published after Goclenius' death:

 Tractatus Physicus & Medicus: De Sanorum Diaeta, Frankfurt 1621, 1645
 Experiment Buch, Frankfurt 1623, 1642 [with a foreword by Theodor Christoph Goclenius]
 Mirabilium Naturae Liber, Frankfurt 1625, 1643 [with a dedicatory letter by Theodor Christoph Goclenius]
 Physiognomica & Chiromantica Specialia, Frankfurt 1625, Halle 1652
 Physiognomica Et Chiromantica Specialia, Hamburg 1661 [enlarged edition]
 Besondere Physiognomische und Chiromantische Anmerckungen, Hamburg 1692 [German translation of the 1661 Hamburg edition of Physiognomica Et Chiromantica Specialia]

References

Further reading
 Gundlach, F. Catalogus Professorum Academiae Marburgensis 1527-1910, Marburg 1927, pp. 388–389
 Külb, Ph. H. Goclenius (Rudolph), in: Ersch, J. S. & Gruber, J. G. Allgemeine Encyklopädie der Wissenschaften und Künste, 71. Theil, Leipzig 1860, pp. 365–367
 Müller-Jahncke, W.-D. Magische Medizin bei Paracelsus und den Paracelsisten: Die Waffensalbe, in: Dilg, P. & Rudolph, H. (Hrsg.), Resultate und Desiderate der Paracelsus-Forschung, Stuttgart 1993, pp. 43–55
 Nauert, C. G., Jr. C. Plinius Secundus (Naturalis Historia), in: Cranz, F. E. (ed.) , Vol. 4, Washington 1980, pp. 413–415 [on Goclenius' Idea Philosophiae Platonicae, 1612]
 Paulet, J.-J., L'antimagnétisme ou origine, progrès, décadence, renouvellement et réfutation du magnétisme animal, London 1784 [contains a description of the Goclenius-Roberti controversy; German translation: Gera 1788]
 Schmidt, F. J. Materialien zur Bibliographie von Rudolph Goclenius sen. (1547-1628) und Rudolph Goclenius jun. (1572-1621), Hamm 1979
 Strieder, F. W. Goclenius (Rudolph) der jüngere, in: Grundlage zu einer Hessischen Gelehrten und Schriftsteller Geschichte, Vierter Band, Göttingen 1784, pp. 488–500

1572 births
1621 deaths
16th-century German physicians
17th-century German physicians
Physicians from Saxony-Anhalt
People from Wittenberg
People from the Electorate of Saxony
Academic staff of the University of Marburg
16th-century German writers
16th-century German male writers
17th-century German writers
17th-century German male writers